Brice Michael Bosnich  (3 June 1936 – 13 April 2015) was an Australian inorganic chemist.  He gained recognition for the design of complex ligands useful in homogeneous catalysis.

Education
He graduated from University of Sydney with a Bachelor of Science degree in 1958, and from Australian National University with a PhD in 1962, where he studied with Francis Patrick Dwyer. Contemporaries included Alan Sargeson.

Career and research
After leaving ANU, he taught at University College London. He then moved to the University of Toronto, where he remained from 1970 to 1987.  Thereafter he became Gustavus F. and Ann M. Swift Distinguished Service Professor at University of Chicago. After his retirement he became a visiting fellow at his alma mater, Australian National University.

As an independent scientist at the University of Toronto, he developed a rational approach to chiral diphosphine ligands, the premier member being chiraphos.  Unlike previous chiral ligands, the chirality of chiraphos arose from the backbone of the chelate.  This concept underpins many of the C2-symmetrical ligands subsequently developed in asymmetric hydrogenation. Other areas of research included hydroacylation catalysis and the development of ligands that mimic the spectroscopic properties of the blue copper proteins.

After his retirement, Bosnich questioned the Royal Society's position on climate change, which is the scientific consensus on the subject.

Awards and honours
Bosnich was elected a Fellow of the Royal Society (FRS) in 2000. His biography reads:

References

1936 births
2015 deaths
Australian chemists
Fellows of the Royal Society
University of Sydney alumni
Australian National University alumni
Academics of University College London
University of Chicago faculty